Casey Charles Penland (born November 13, 1997) is a professional American soccer player who currently plays for Charlotte Independence in the USL Championship.

Career

College & Amateur
Penland played four years of college soccer at the University of North Carolina at Greensboro between 2016 and 2019.

While at college, Penland appeared in the squad for NPSL side Tulsa Athletics during their 2016 season, and played with USL League Two side North Carolina Fusion U23 in 2019.

Professional
On January 24, 2020, Penland signed for USL Championship side Charlotte Independence. He made his professional debut on March 8, 2020, appearing as an 89th-minute substitute in a 2–1 victory over Sporting Kansas City II.

References

1997 births
Living people
American soccer players
Association football defenders
Charlotte Independence players
Soccer players from North Carolina
UNC Greensboro Spartans men's soccer players
USL League Two players
USL Championship players